The Cleveland Centre, is a shopping centre in the town of Middlesbrough, North Yorkshire, England. It is owned by Middlesbrough Council, previous Waypoint New Frontier until 2022. It was renamed The Mall (after its previous owner The Mall Fund) in 2011 but reverted to the original name the following year.

Centre Information

Transport links 
The shopping centre is located in the centre of Middlesbrough and is a short walk to:
Middlesbrough railway station
Middlesbrough bus station

Stores 

As of 20/07/2022 there is 

Centre Mall
One Below, WHSmith, Post Office, Timpsons, Boots, JD Sports, Newlook, ToyTown, Iceland, HMV, F Hinds, scents store, Zinergy drinks 

Newton Mall 
Poundland, Well Pharmacy, Costa, NM Money, James Jones Beautiful Furnishing, Kindamagic, Bubbles Milkshake, Brillen Optitions (Weekly COVID CLINIC in unity 10 newton mall) 

Wesley Mall
Vision Express 
Lush 
The Perfume Shop 

Outside shops 
NatWest, Betfred, Vodafone, Holland & Barrett, Deichmann, Sports Direct, Game, USC, Flannels, Stormfront (Apple Store)

There are many more shops throughout the centre not listed above.

References

External links 
Cleveland Centre website

Shopping centres in North Yorkshire
Buildings and structures in Middlesbrough